Rafael Henrique Campos Pereira (born 8 April 1997) is a Brazilian specialising in the high hurdles. He won a gold medal at the 2021 South American Championships in Athletics. He competed at the 2020 Summer Olympics.

At the 2022 Brazilian championships held in Rio de Janeiro, he broke she South American record in 110 m hurdles with a time of 13.17.

Personal bests
110 m hurdles: 13.17 (wind: +0.4 m/s) –  Rio de Janeiro, 22 June 2022
60 m hurdles: 7.58 –  Berlin, 4 Feb 2022

International competitions

References

External links

1997 births
Living people
Brazilian male hurdlers
South American Games gold medalists in athletics
Athletes (track and field) at the 2020 Summer Olympics
People from Contagem
Olympic athletes of Brazil
Sportspeople from Minas Gerais
South American Championships in Athletics winners
21st-century Brazilian people